Young Eagles of Estonia is a patriotic youth paramilitary organization in Estonia, established in 1930. It is not a defence organisation.

Organisation and Membership 
Although sponsored by the Estonian Defence League and having many members wearing military camouflage uniforms, the Young Eagles is not a defence organisation (or a part of the Estonian military). However many of the organization's adult leaders have a military background and members do participate with the volunteer or regular forces on some occasions.

Young Eagles accepts (drugs-, smoking- and alcohol free) boys from 7 to 19 years of age and adult leaders from 18 years. There are total about 3000 members in regional units throughout the country. The 15 battalion-size regional units (Estonian: malev) consist of separate platoons and sometimes company-sized subunits (Estonian: malevkond). Platoons are mostly called by the name of the place in which they are based; those attached to schools may use the name of the school.

The headquarters of the organisation is located in Tallinn Toompea street 8.

Activities 
The objective of the organisation is to raise young people as good citizens with healthy bodies and minds. Traditional scouting method is used sometimes. Activities include: 
formation drills, 
 first aid, 
 orienteering, 
shooting firearms, 
 airsoft and field skills, 
 hiking

The organization also participates in numerous events, camps and competitions. The most well known but also the most difficult is the Mini-Erna reconnaissance competition (30–50 km).

Some junior and adult members also undergo leadership training.

See also 
 Estonian Defence League
 Young Riflemen
 Army Cadet Force

References

External links
 

Youth organizations based in Estonia
Military of Estonia